Figaro may refer to:

Literature 
 Figaro, the central character in:
 The Barber of Seville (play), a 1775 play by Pierre Beaumarchais
 The Barber of Seville (Paisiello), a 1782 opera by Paisiello based on the play
 The Barber of Seville, an 1816 opera by Rossini based on the play
 Figaro qua, Figaro là, 1950 Italian comedy film directed by Carlo Ludovico Bragaglia
 The Guilty Mother, a 1792 play by Beaumarchais
 La mère coupable, a 1966 opera by Milhaud based on the play
 The Marriage of Figaro (play), a 1784 play by Beaumarchais
 The Marriage of Figaro, a 1786 opera by Mozart based on the play
 Figaro, a comic strip character in The Topper

Publications 
 Le Figaro, the oldest extant newspaper in France
 Figaro in London, an early Victorian comic magazine published in England
 London Figaro, a late Victorian satirical magazine published in England
 Queensland Figaro, a weekly newspaper published from 1883 to 1936 in Australia
 Figaro (Vienna), a Viennese satirical magazine published 1857–1919
 Figaro (New Orleans), a weekly magazine published from 1883 to 1884

Entertainment 

 The Crazy Day or The Marriage of Figaro, a 2004 comedy musical staged by Russian and Ukrainian television channels NTV (Russia) and Inter
 Figaro (Disney), a kitten created by The Walt Disney Company, which first appeared in the 1940 film Pinocchio
 Figaro, a kingdom in the video game Final Fantasy VI
 Galileo Figaro, character from the stage musical We Will Rock You
 MDR Figaro, German broadcaster Mitteldeutscher Rundfunk's cultural radio channel
 Figaro (film), a 1929 French silent historical comedy film
 Figaro, movie production company of Joseph L. Mankiewicz
 The Abduction of Figaro, an opera parody by Peter Schickele

Music 
 "Figaro" (song), a 1978 UK number-one song by Brotherhood of Man
 "Figaro", a song by Madvillain from their album Madvillainy
 "Figaro", a song by Nine Muses from their 2012 album Sweet Rendezvous

People
 Pen-name of Henry Clapp, Jr. editor of The Saturday Press
 Figaro, nickname of Spanish author Mariano José de Larra

Other 
 Figaro chain, a type of chain used in jewelry
 Figaro Coffee Company, a chain of coffee shops in Philippines
 Figaro (genus), a genus of catsharks
 Nissan Figaro, a retro-styled compact car produced by Nissan in a limited production run in 1991
 Bénéteau Figaro, a design of sailing yacht used for French Offshore Racing
 Bénéteau Figaro 2, a design of sailing yacht used for French Offshore Racing
 Bénéteau Figaro 3, a design of sailing yacht used for French Offshore Racing
 Solitaire du Figaro, a sailing race, taking place every summer between France, England, Ireland, and Spain